Reg Spencer (1 December 1908 – 16 March 1981) was an English footballer who played as a left half for Tranmere Rovers. He made 261 appearances for Tranmere, scoring 3 goals.

References

1908 births
1981 deaths
People from Queensferry, Flintshire
Sportspeople from Flintshire
Association football wing halves
Welsh footballers
Tranmere Rovers F.C. players